VH1 ILL-ustrated is an adult animated sketch comedy television series that aired on VH1 and was conceived by animation producer Bob Cesca that parodied pop culture and politics. This is the only project that Cesca's Camp Chaos Productions produced, besides Napster Bad and an unreleased Sopranos parody miniseries. Recurring characters include satirical caricatures of Axl Rose (who works at a McDonald's restaurant, and screams people's orders), Michael Jackson (who leaves Earth in search of a place that will accept him and his monkey, Bubbles), among others.

The animated series were later aired on MTV2 (2006) and SBS (2007).

Episodes

Season 1 (2003)
 Episode 1  October 17, 2003 
 Episode 2  October 17, 2003  
 Episode 3  October 17, 2003

Season 2 (2004)
 Episode 4  May 17, 2004 
 Episode 5  May 18, 2004  
 Episode 6  May 19, 2004  
 Episode 7  May 20, 2004  
 Episode 8  May 21, 2004  
 Episode 9  May 28, 2004 
 Episode 10  April 6, 2004  
 Episode 11  May 6, 2004 
 Episode 12  June 18, 2004
 Episode 13  June 25, 2004

Segments
The majority of sketches are a satirical view of world issues. An example includes SpongeBong HempPants, a parody of SpongeBob SquarePants, in which "SpongeBong" is a green-colored marijuana addict, while "Hashbrick" is a brick of hash. Another recurring parody is of the Hanna-Barbera cartoon Yogi Bear featuring Al Gore as the ranger, and George W. Bush and Dick Cheney as the meddling bears who cause problems for Jellystone National Park; such mischief includes drilling for oil in the middle of a lake, when explicitly told not to by Ranger Gore.

Other segments are general satires of popular culture, such as Popeye in Anime, a parody of Popeye the Sailor Man as if it was drawn in an anime style, and a segment in which the rock band Guns N' Roses is working in a McDonald's and take orders to the tune of their song "Welcome to the Jungle".

They also frequently poked-fun at their home station's (VH1) new series of shows having nothing to do with music, such as a segment called VH1's I Love 5 Seconds Ago, in which famous actors, actresses and singers would tell the best thing about five seconds ago. An example of this would be "I was wearing a total hipster shirt five seconds ago, and I still wear it now. Cool never goes out of style."

References

External links
 

2000s American adult animated television series
2000s American political comedy television series
2000s American satirical television series
2000s American sketch comedy television series
2003 American television series debuts
2004 American television series endings
American adult animated comedy television series
English-language television shows
Political satirical television series
VH1 original programming